Half Moon, Halfmoon, half-moon, or Halve Maen may refer to:
 First quarter or last quarter lunar phase
 semicircle shape

Food
Half-moons or black and white cookies
Half-moon cookie (Philippines), a semicircular or crescent-shaped butter cookie

Places
Half Moon Island, one of the South Shetland Islands of Antarctica
Halfmoon, New York, U.S.; a town in Saratoga County
Half Moon, North Carolina, U.S.; a location in Onslow County
Half Moon (Washington), U.S.; a mountain in the Cascade Range
Halfmoon Township, Centre County, Pennsylvania, U.S.

Pubs
Half Moon, Herne Hill, a pub and music venue in London
The Half Moon, Putney, a pub and music venue in London

Ships
Halve Maen, a Dutch East India Company flyboat with which Henry Hudson explored parts of North America
Half Moon (1989 replica), a replica of the ship that Henry Hudson sailed in 1609 in exploration of parts of North America
Half Moon (shipwreck), a German sailboat that sank off the coast of Florida in 1930
USCGC Half Moon (WAVP-378), later WHEC-378, a United States Coast Guard cutter in commission from 1948 to 1969
USS Half Moon (AVP-26), a United States Navy seaplane tender in commission from 1943 to 1946

Other uses
Half Moon (film), a 2006 Iranian film by Bahman Ghobadi
Half Moon (lacrosse), First Nations lacrosse player
Halfmoon or Medialuna californiensis, a sea chub native to the Pacific Ocean
Halve Maen (Efteling), a ship swing in the Efteling theme park in the Netherlands
Half Moon Festival, a bi-monthly event on Ko Pha Ngan, Thailand
Half Moon Run, a Canadian indie rock group
Ardha chandrasana or Half Moon Pose, a yoga asana
"Half Moon", a song by Iron & Wine from the album Kiss Each Other Clean
a code name for the first-generation prototype Oculus Touch virtual reality motion controllers
the supposed stage name of Beta from The Walking Dead
'Halfmoon', the stage name of a planet in the Milky Way Wishes subgame of Kirby Super Star and Kirby Super Star Ultra.
'Half Moon', a character from the Warriors series of books. She later becomes 'Stoneteller'.

See also

Half Moon Bay (disambiguation), the name of various crescent-shaped bays

Demilune (disambiguation)
Crescent (disambiguation)
Lunar phase
Lunula (anatomy)
Moon (disambiguation)
Half (disambiguation)